Trink Hill is a 212-metre-high hill that lies between the hamlets of Trink and Cripplesease, near to the village of Nancledra, Cornwall, UK. Trencrom Hill lies one kilometre to the South East.

Location
(), Landranger Map Number: 203
Latitude: 50.181219N  Longitude: 5.497563W

History

A Round barrow exists at the summit, an OS Trig point within it.

A stone named after the nearby Giew Mine (or Trink Hill menhir) stands on the western slope of the hill.

Twelve O'Clock Rock is a granite outcrop, supposed to be an unusual logan stone in that it can only be rocked at midnight.

Wheal Sister mine, covering both Trencrom and Trink hills was a consolidation of four tin mines in October 1875. The mines were previously known as Wheals Kitty, Margaret, Mary and Trencrom.

There is a covering of bell heather (Erica cinerea) on the hill and in 1926 Miss Gertrude Waterer found a variety with a prostrate habit and lavender flowers. It was commercially introduced by Knap Hill Nursery's in 1933 and awarded a Royal Horticultural Society's Award of Merit in the same year and in 1984 a Garden Merit.

References

Hill forts in Cornwall
Hills of Cornwall
Penwith